The Polishing Cloth is a small piece of off-white microfiber cloth sold by Apple Inc. since October 2021 as a screen cleaning aid for its laptops and mobile devices. It is also intended as a replacement for the cloth that comes with Apple's monitors such as the Pro Display XDR, and is designed for cleaning the 'nano-texture glass' version of the monitor with.

The cloth gained media attention due to its high $19 retail price. The New York Times described this pricing as "bold even by Apple’s standards, a company whose legions of loyal customers are conditioned to stomach steep prices." Nonetheless, it was Apple's most back-ordered item in October 2021, with delivery times of several months. The expensive cloth and its popularity were soon the subject of numerous jokes in the media and on social media, which in turn provided grounds for criticism of the media for providing Apple's extravagances with free advertising.

The tech website iFixit 'disassembled' the cloth as part of a tongue-in-cheek product teardown, describing it as being composed of two layers and having "a distinct synthetic leather feel (...) with a hint of fuzziness, similar to Alcantara." The cloth also has the Apple logo embossed in the bottom right corner.

See also
iPod Socks

References 

Apple Inc. products
Cleaning products
Products introduced in 2021